Tanamera – Lion of Singapore is a 1989 Australian drama serial which is a co-production between Central Independent television and Grundy in 1989.

Plot
The lives of two leading families of Singapore, the Dexters and the Soongs, become intertwined when John Dexter falls in love with Julie Soong. Action takes place between the years 1935 and 1948.

Notable cast members included Christopher Bowen, Khym Lam, Anthony Calf, Gary Sweet, John Jarratt, Anne-Louise Lambert, Penne Hackforth-Jones, Lewis Fiander, Bryan Marshall, Betty Lucas, Wallas Eaton, Darren Yap and Anthony Wong.

The series is based on the novel, Tanamera, by Noel Barber. Tanamera is the name of the house built by Grandpa Jack, the patriarch of the Dexter family. Tanamera is derived from Tanah Merah, Malay for Red Earth. The grounds of the huge Tanamera bungalow consisted largely of red soil.

Broadcast
The series was first shown in the United Kingdom, and from April 1989, Albania, Finland, New Zealand and America as well.

References

External links
 
 BFI.org
Tanamera Lion of Singapore at AustLit

1980s Australian television miniseries
Australian drama television series
Network 10 original programming
1989 Australian television series debuts
1989 Australian television series endings
1989 British television series debuts
1989 British television series endings
1980s British drama television series
Television series produced by The Reg Grundy Organisation
Television series by ITV Studios
ITV television dramas
1980s British television miniseries
English-language television shows
Television shows produced by Central Independent Television